The right to sit in the United States refers to state and local legislation guaranteeing workers the right to sit at work when standing is not necessary. Between 1881 and 1917, almost all states, the District of Columbia, and Puerto Rico had passed legislation concerning suitable seating for workers. These laws were reforms during the Progressive Era, spearheaded by women workers in the labor movement. The texts of these laws originally almost always specified that they applied only to female workers. Most states with right to sit laws have subsequently amended their legislation to include all workers regardless of sex. Though largely obscure and rarely enforced for over a century, right to sit laws have obtained new relevance following several high-profile lawsuits against major corporations in California and other states during the 2010s and 2020s. States with current, gender-neutral right to sit legislation include California, Florida, Massachusetts, Montana, New Jersey, Oregon, and Wisconsin. Some states, including New Mexico, New York, Pennsylvania, and West Virginia, maintain gendered language referring to female workers only. Other states, such as Alabama, Arkansas, Connecticut, Idaho, Kentucky, Maine, Michigan, Missouri, Nevada, and New Hampshire, as well as the District of Columbia, repealed their right to sit laws between 1972 and 2015. Mississippi and Hawaii are the only states to have never had right to sit laws. Right to sit laws have been enacted at the local level in several cities, including Portland, Oregon and St. Louis, Missouri.

History
In the late 1800s and early 1900s, during the Progressive Era, numerous states passed laws granting workers the right to suitable seats, specifically for women workers. According to a report by the sociologist Annie Marion MacLean, 22 states had passed suitable seating laws for women workers by 1897.

By 1915, only four states lacked a suitable seating law for women workers: Idaho, Mississippi, Nevada, and New Mexico. Principles of Labor Legislation, a foundational labor law text written in 1916 by John R. Commons and John Bertram Andrews, noted that an aspect of early 20th century labor reforms that is "[p]articularly striking is the special protection of women manifested in the laws on seats, toilets, and dressing-rooms." At the time, all right to sit legislation in the United States was gendered, applying specifically to women workers. They write that as "far back as the end of the 'seventies the dangers of constant standing for salesgirls were recognized, and it was urged that they be furnished seats and allowed to use them." They note that the first state to pass right to sit legislation for women workers was New York in 1881. By 1916, almost every state had such a right to sit law for women workers. Most state laws covered manufacturing and mechanical jobs, with some states covering virtually all jobs. Commons and Andrews claimed that these early right to sit laws were "of little real importance in protecting health...since it is practically impossible to see that employers and foremen allow the seats to be used even when provided."

By 1932, almost all of the states, the District of Columbia, and the territories of Puerto Rico and the Philippines, had passed laws requiring some form of suitable seating for women workers. The majority of states with right to sit laws specify that "suitable seats" be provided by employers and that workers be allowed to sit when standing is not required. The only state in the United States without a right to sit law by 1932 was Mississippi. North Dakota and New Mexico passed suitable sitting laws in 1922 and 1931, respectively.

The 1965 Handbook on Women Workers published by the Women's Bureau Bulletin recommends, as a health standard, "Suitable seats in adequate numbers; workers free to use them when not actively engaged in performance of duties that require a standing position, or at all times when nature of job permits."

After largely falling into obscurity for over a century, these suitable seating laws have gained greater recognition due to multiple lawsuits in the state of California during the late 2010s.

Legislation by state

Summary of legislation

Alabama
First passed in 1907, Alabama's right to sit law for women workers was repealed on April 21, 2015.

Alaska
As of 1959, Alaska law stated that "Wherever possible women shall be seated at their work, with stools or chairs provided with a backrest and contribute to good posture; when required to stand at their work for prolonged periods, chairs shall be provided for their use during rest periods."

Arizona
Arizona first passed a right to sit law in 1912.

Arizona's General Construction Safety Code, 1957 prohibited women from working in mines, quarries, coal breakers, or other jobs that required standing. The law also stipulated that "Employers of females in any place or establishment must provide suitable seats, chairs, or benches and permit their use when females are not engaged in active duties."

Arkansas
Arkansas first passed a suitable seating law for women workers in 1913. The law stated that in any "manufacturing, mechanical, mercantile and other establishment where girls or women are employed, there shall be provided, and conveniently situated, seats sufficient to comfortably seat such girls or women, and during such times as they are not required by their duties to be upon their feet, they shall be allowed to use the seats."

Arkansas's right to sit law for women workers was repealed in 1997.

California
In 1911, the California State Legislature passed a provision requiring all employers in the mercantile industry to "provide suitable seats for all female employees" and to allow them to "use such seats when they are not engaged in the active duties of
their employment." Workers who are not "engaged in the active duties of their employment and the nature of the work requires standing, an adequate number of suitable seats shall be placed in reasonable proximity to the work area and employees shall be permitted to use such seats when it does not interfere with the performance of their duties."

The gendered provision in California's suitable seating law was struck down as discriminatory in federal court in 1974.

In 2016, the Supreme Court of California ruled in Kilby v. CVS Pharmacy, Inc. that workers whose jobs can be done while sitting down some or all of the time cannot be denied suitable seating. The class action lawsuit was brought by Nykeya Kilby, a CVS worker who was forced to stand while working.

In 2018, Walmart was accused of violating California law by refusing to allow their workers to sit. Walmart denied any wrongdoing, but agreed to pay $65 million in compensation to 100,000 current and former employees.

Colorado
Colorado first passed a right to sit law for women workers in 1885.

In 1913, Colorado labor law required employers of women to allow them to sit while working, stating that "Suitable seats for the use of the women shall be provided in all manufacturing, mechanical, or mercantile establishments, and their use shall be permitted when the women are not necessarily engaged in the active duties for which they are employed."

Connecticut
Beginning in 1893, Connecticut labor law stated that "[e]very person or company employing females in any mercantile, mechanical, or manufacturing establishment shall provide suitable seats for the use of all females so employed and shall permit the use of these seats by the females when they are not actively engaged in the duties for which they are employed." Employers who violated the law could be fined between $5 and $50.

In 2005, Connecticut repealed the right to sit law.

Delaware
In 1897, Delaware passed a right to sit law stating that "suitable seats should be provided for women employees In manufacturing" mechanical, or mercantile establishments and that the use of such seats 'should be permitted when the women were not necessarily engaged in the duties for which they were employed." Employers found to violate the law could be fined between $25 and $50.

Florida
Florida's right to sit law was passed in 1899.

Florida Statute 448.05 protects a worker's right to sit. Merchants and shop-owners in Florida who require their workers to stand when not necessary, fail to provide suitable seating at their own expense to workers, or prohibit workers from making use of suitable seating, can be found "guilty of a misdemeanor of the second degree." Florida is one of the few states to have a right to sit law that was always gender neutral.

Georgia
In 1889, Georgia labor law stated that it was a requirement for "persons or corporations employing females in manufacturing, mechanical or mercantile establishments to provide suitable seats, and permit their use by such females, when not necessarily engaged in the active duties for which they were employed."

Idaho
Idaho labor law required "employers in establishments where females are employed to provide suitable seats and permit their use when not engaged in active duties for which they are employed." The law was first passed in 1913.

Idaho's right to sit law was repealed in 1985.

Illinois
Illinois first passed a suitable seating law for women workers in 1901.

Indiana
Indiana's right to sit law for women workers was passed in 1891.

As of 1917, Section 2 of Indiana Senate Bill No. 140 established that all employers in "any express or transportation company, laundry, hotel, public lodging house, place of amusement, restaurant, telephone, manufacturing, mechanical or mercantile establishments, employing any female person, shall provide suitable seats for all female employees and shall permit them to use such seats when same does not interfere with their employment."

Iowa
Iowa's right to sit law was first passed in 1892.

In 1922, Iowa labor law (Code 1939, sec. 1485) stated that "[a]ll employers of females in any mercantile or manufacturing business or occupation shall provide and maintain suitable seats when practicable for the use of such females at or beside the counter or work bench where employed, and permit the use thereof by such employees to such extent as the work engaged in may reasonably admit of." A 1922 report from the United States Department of Labor reports that such laws were difficult to enforce, "apparent from a study of their phraseology". Language such as "shall provide...when practicable" and "permit the use...to such extent as the work engaged in may reasonably admit of" are specifications which made enforcement difficult. The report claimed that seating arrangements at Iowa establishments in 1922 ranged from "workers stand all day" with "not a chair in sight" to "all of them sit all the time." The report states that either extreme of sitting or standing can produce fatigue, depending on occupation. Over 100 Iowa establishments were found to have no suitable seating, despite the law's requirement.

In 1924, a revision to the Iowa law added workshops to the establishments covered by the right to sit and established a fine of not more than $10 for employers found to violate the law.

As of 1970, Iowa law required "employers of females in workshops, mercantile, manufacturing or business establishments to provide suitable seats and permit their use when duties reasonably allow it."

Kansas
Kansas first passed a suitable seating law for women workers in 1901.

Kentucky
Kentucky first passed a right to sit law in 1912. Recodified in 1942, the law was repealed in 1972. Kentucky's legislation had only applied to women workers.

Louisiana
Louisiana first passed a suitable seating law for women workers in 1900.

Maine
First passed in 1911, Maine's right to sit law for women workers was repealed in 1975.

Maryland
One April 4, 1896, the State of Maryland enacted legislation stipulating that a chair or stool be provided to women workers in mercantile establishments. Maryland's state law was less comprehensive than the City of Baltimore's law, as the Maryland state law did not apply to manufacturing establishments. Maryland's right to sit law provided that in "every retail, jobbing, or wholesale drygoods store, notion, millinery or any other business where any female salespeople are employed, a seat shall be provided for each one of such female help, and they shall not be forbidden to avail themselves of any opportunity of rest not interfering with their duties." A 1904 report from the Maryland Bureau of Statistics and Information cited Maryland's right to sit law as an example of a law with a "remedial character...which, if properly enforced, might prove of great advantage to the masses of the people", however the report notes that right to sit laws are "oft-times lost sight of because of the multifarious duties of the Police Department and the impossibility of a proper enforcement of such laws."

In 1898, the City of Baltimore approved a law requiring that every "employer of females in any mercantile or manufacturing establishment in the City of Baltimore must provide and maintain suitable seats for the use of such employees." Employers who violated the law could be found guilty of a misdemeanor and fined $150 upon conviction. While the law was well-known, in 1912 Elizabeth Beardsley Butler described the law's provisions as "vague and unsatisfactory in wording", a defect she thought was common among many right to sit laws in the United States.

Baltimore's suitable seating law was in effect as of 1956.

Massachusetts
In 1882, Massachusetts labor law required that "Every person or corporation employing females in any manufacturing, mechanical or mercantile establishment in this Commonwealth shall provide suitable seats for the use of the females so employed", furthermore permitting the use of "such seats by them when they are not necessarily engaged in the active duties for which they are employed." Any employer found to have violated the right to sit could be fined between $10 and $30. The law was passed on 19 November 1881 and went into effect on 1 February 1882.

While the law was originally intended to protect "women and children", in 1974 the language of the law was amended to be gender neutral in order to protect all workers regardless of sex.

Massachusetts law currently states that "Employers shall provide suitable seats for the use of their employees and shall permit such employees to use such seats whenever they are not necessarily engaged in the active duties of their employment, and shall also provide for their use and permit them to use suitable seats while at work, except when the work cannot properly be performed in a sitting position or when such seats may reasonably be expected to result in an unsafe or hazardous working condition." Any employer who violates this law can be punished by a fine of between $50 and $200.

Michigan
First passed in 1883, Michigan's right to sit law for women workers was repealed in 1975. The law had stated that "[n]o employer of female help shall neglect or refuse to provide seats as provided in this act, nor shall make any rules, orders or regulations in their shops, stores or other places of business requiring females to remain standing when not necessarily in service or labor therein."

Minnesota
Minnesota passed a right to sit law for women workers in 1887. The law stated that it "shall be the duty of all employers of females in any mercantile or manufacturing business or occupation to provide and maintain suitable seats for the use of such female employes, and to permit the use of such seats by such employes to such an extent as may be reasonable for the preservation of their health."

Minnesota's right to sit law remained in effect as of 1967.

Mississippi
By 1932, Mississippi was the only state in the United States that didn't have some form of right to sit law. By December of 1944, Mississippi still had no right to sit law.

Missouri
Missouri passed a right to sit law in 1885. The law was repealed on August 28th, 2007.

The St. Louis Code of Ordinances mandates "all employers of females in any mercantile business or occupation to provide and maintain suitable seats for the use of female employees, at or beside the counter or work bench where employed, and to permit the use of seats by employees to an extent as may be reasonable for the preservation of their health." Any employer found to have violated this provision is guilty of a misdemeanor.

Montana
Montana first passed a right to sit law in 1885.

Montana labor law states that employers "shall provide suitable seats for all employees and shall permit them to use such seats when they are not employed in the active duties of their employment." Employers found violating this provision can be found guilty of a misdemeanor and upon conviction fined between $50 and $200, imprisoned in the county jail between 10 and 60 days, or be both fined and imprisoned.

Nebraska
Nebraska first passed a suitable seating law for women workers in 1883.

Nevada
On February 14, 1917, Nevada passed a right to sit law for women workers. The legislation stated that "employer in any manufacturing, mechanical, or mercantile establishment, laundry, hotel, or restaurant, or other establishment, employing any female, shall provide suitable seats for all female employees, and shall permit them to use such seats when they are not engaged in the active duties of their employment."

In 1975, the suitable seating provision in Chapter 609 of the Nevada Revised Statutes was repealed.

New Hampshire
New Hampshire labor law formerly required that suitable seating be provided by employers to women workers in all manufacturing, mechanical, or mercantile establishments, and the use of such seats must be permitted.

New Hampshire's right to sit law was repealed in 1985.

New Jersey
New Jersey first passed a right to sit law in 1882.

The right to sit law in New Jersey was made gender neutral in 1980.

New Jersey labor law states that all employers "in any manufacturing, mechanical or mercantile establishment or in the services and operations incident to any commercial employment shall provide and maintain suitable seats conveniently situated and shall permit the use of such seats by employees at all times except when necessarily engaged in the discharge of duties that cannot properly be performed in a sitting position."

New Mexico
New Mexico labor law states that all employers with women workers "shall provide and furnish suitable seats, to be used by such employees when not engaged in the active duties of their employment, and shall give notice to all such female employees by posting in a conspicuous place, on the premises of such employment in letters not less than one inch in height, that all such female employees will be permitted to use seats when not so engaged." Employers found violating the law can be found guilty of a misdemeanor and fined between $50 and $200 per violation.

New York
In 1881, New York became the first state in the US to pass right to sit legislation for women workers. New York labor law states that a "sufficient number of suitable seats, with backs where practicable, shall be provided and maintained in every factory, mercantile establishment, freight or passenger  elevator, hotel  and  restaurant  for female employees who shall be allowed to use the seats to such an extent as may be reasonable for the preservation of their health." Factory workers "shall be allowed to use such seats whenever they are engaged in work which can be properly
performed in a sitting posture", while workers in the mercantile industry must be provided one seat for every three workers and "if the duties of such employees are to be performed principally in front of a counter, table, desk or fixture, such seats shall be placed in front thereof" or behind as needed.

In 2019-2020, New York Assembly Bill A7649 was proposed to amend the state's right to sit law to cover all workers regardless of sex.

North Carolina
North Carolina first passed a right to sit law in 1909. The law stated that "persons, firms, or corporations who employ females in a store, shop, office, or manufacturing establishment, as clerks, operators, or helpers in any business, trade, or occupation carried on or operated in the state of North Carolina, shall be required to procure and provide proper and suitable seats for all such females, and shall permit the use of such seats, rests, or stools as may be necessary, and shall not make any rules, regulations, or orders preventing the use of such seats, stools or rests when any such female employee or employees are not actively employed or engaged in their work in such business or employment." Any employer found to have violated the law could be found guilty of a misdemeanor and upon conviction fined between $25 and $100 per the discretion of the court.

North Dakota
North Dakota passed a suitable seating law for women workers in 1922, one of the last states to pass such legislation.

Ohio
In Jones Co. v. Walker, decided on March 9, 1971, Ohio's gendered provisions in its right to sit law were ruled by the Franklin County Court of Common Pleas to be a form of sex discrimination favoring female workers over male workers, thereby being a violation of Title VII of the Civil Rights Act of 1964.

Oklahoma
Oklahoma first passed a right to sit law in 1908.

Section 3732 of Oklahoma's Revised Laws of 1910 stated that child workers were allowed the right to sit and that "the employer must provide suitable seats and permit their use so far as the nature of the work allows."

Oklahoma's right to sit law was made gender neutral in 1991.

Oregon
Oregon passed a right to sit law for women workers on 19 February 1903, due to activism from the labour movement.

Oregon labor law guarantees the right to suitable seating for minors while working. Minors in cannery operations are granted one seat for every three minor workers. Suitable seating is defined as "convenient, comfortable and safe seats where the work is such that minors may sit while working."

The Oregon Administrative Rules states that every "employer shall provide to each employee when required by the nature of the work, suitable seats, suitable tables, and suitable work benches." Suitable seating is defined as "convenient, comfortable and safe seats where the work is such that employees may sit while working." In cannery operations, workers must be granted one seat for every three workers. Suitable tales and benches are defined by the law as "tables and work benches so constructed as to give the greatest possible comfort and convenience to employees where the nature of the work and the safety and convenience of the employee requires a bench or table."

The City of Portland has a local law stipulating that every "employer in any manufacturing or mercantile establishment, store, department store, laundry, hotel or restaurant or other establishments shall provide for all employees a sufficient number of suitable seats, which in no case shall be less than one seat for each three employees, and shall permit them to use such seats when such employees are not engaged in active duties of their employment."

Pennsylvania
Pennsylvania first passed a suitable seating law for women workers in 1887. The current suitable seating law, dating to 1917, states that all persons "employing or permitting females to work in any establishment shall provide suitable seats for their use conveniently assessable while they are working, and shall maintain and keep them there, and shall permit the reasonable use thereof by such females. At least one seat shall be provided for every five females employed or permitted to work."

Rhode Island
Rhode Island first passed a suitable seating law for women workers in 1894.

South Carolina
South Carolina first passed a suitable seating law for women workers in 1899.

South Dakota
South Dakota labor law guarantees the right to suitable seating for child workers, stating that "any mercantile or manufacturing establishment, hotel, or restaurant where children are employed, suitable seats shall be maintained in the room where such employees work and such use thereof permitted as may be necessary for preservation of the health of such employees." Employers found guilty of violating this provision can be convicted of a Class 2 misdemeanor.

Tennessee
Tennessee first passed a suitable seating law for women workers in 1913.

Texas
In 1913, Texas "required that suitable seats be provided for women employees in any manufacturing, mechanical, or mercantile establishment, workshop, laundry, printing office, dressmaking or millinery establishment, hotel, restaurant, theater; telegraph or telephone establishment and office, or any other establishment. The use of these seats was to be permitted when the women were not engaged in the duties of their employment." The law exempted women stenographers and pharmacists and did not apply to residents of cities with a population under 5,000. Employers who violated the law could be fined between $50 and $200, be imprisoned from 5 to 30 days, or be both fined and imprisoned. A subsequent legislative act in 1915 further covered "any factory,
mine, mill, workshop, mechanical or mercantile establishment, laundry, hotel, restaurant, rooming' house, theater or moving-picture show, barber shop, telegraph, telephone, or other office, express or transportation company, any State institution, or any other establishment, institution, or enterprise where women are employed." Employers were required to furnish the seating as well as post notices alerting workers of their right to sit. The 1915 law further exempted telegraph and telephone company workers and mercantile workers in rural areas with a population under 3,000.

Utah
Utah first passed a suitable seating law for women workers in 1897.

Vermont
Vermont first passed a suitable seating law in 1915. The law stated that "[s]eats must be provided in mercantile establishments, stores, shops, hotels and restaurants where women or girls are employed, and the use of these seats must be permitted".

Virginia
In Virginia, some of the earliest labor laws were passed to protect women workers. 1897-98 Va. Acts 45 required employers to grant women workers suitable seating when not performing work that necessitates standing. Virginia's law stated that "[c]hairs, stools, or other suitable seats shall be maintained in all factories, shops, mills, laundries, mercantile and manufacturing establishments, except fruit and vegetable canning factories, for the use of female employees therein to the number of at least one seat for every three females employed, and the use thereof by such employees shall be allowed at such times and
to such extent as may be necessary for the preservation of their health. Such seats shall be placed where the work of such females is to be principally performed, whether in front of or behind a counter, table, desk, or other fixture." An employer found to have violated the law could be found guilty of a misdemeanor and upon conviction be fined up to $25 and costs determined by the discretion of the court.

Washington, D.C.
In 1895, the United States Congress passed a law for the District of Columbia "providing that all persons who employ women in stores, shops, offices or manufactories as clerks, assistants, operatives, or helpers in any business, trade, or occupation are required to procure and provide proper and suitable seats for all their women employees and to permit the use of these seats when the women are not actively employed in their work."

As of 1961, Washington, D.C. required employers of women to "provide proper and suitable seats for them, and to permit their use when not actively engaged in duties."

By 1998, the law stipulated for all employers "to provide and procure proper and suitable seats for all such employees" and that employers must not make "any rules, regulations or orders preventing the use of such stools or seats when any such employees are not actively employed in their work." (D.C. Code §36-901.)

Washington D.C.'s right to sit law was made gender neutral in 1976. It was repealed by an act of Congress in 2004.

Washington state
Washington's right to sit law for women workers was passed in 1911. Washington labor law requires that "[e]very employer in establishments where females are employed shall provide suitable seats for them and permit their use."

West Virginia
West Virginia labor law states that every "person, firm or corporation employing females in any factory, mercantile establishment, mill or workshop in this state shall provide a reasonable number of suitable seats for the use of such female employees, and shall permit the use of such seats by them when they are not necessarily engaged in active duties for which they are employed, and shall permit the use of such seats at all times when such use would not actually and necessarily interfere with the proper discharge of the duties of such employees, and, where practicable, such seats shall be made permanent fixtures and may be so constructed or adjusted that, when not in use, they will not obstruct such female employee when engaged in the performance of her duties."

In 2020, West Virginia Delegate Sean Hornbuckle introduced House Bill 4909 to amend West  Virginia's right to sit law to include all workers regardless of sex or occupation.

Wisconsin
The Wisconsin Legislature first passed a right to sit law in 1899.

In 1942, the law stated that "[e]very person or corporation employing females in any manufacturing, mechanical or mercantile establishment in the state of Wisconsin shall provide suitable seats for the females so employed, and shall permit the use of such seats by them when they are not necessarily engaged in the active duties for which they are employed." Any employer convicted of violating this provision could be found guilty of a misdemeanor and fined between $10 and $30.

Wisconsin's right to sit law became gender neutral in 1975.
The text of the law was amended again in 1997 by Assembly Bill 683, with minor changes to the wording.

The current Wisconsin law mandating suitable sitting does not contain gendered language referring to female workers, stating that employers "in any manufacturing, mechanical or mercantile establishment in this state shall provide suitable seats for its employees, and shall permit the use of those seats by its employees when the employees are not necessarily engaged in the active duties for which they are employed." The fine for an employer who violates the provision remains between $10 and $30.

Wyoming
In 1901, Wyoming passed labor legislation (Acts 1901, C. 33) stipulating that suitable seating be "required in manufacturing, mechanical or mercantile establishments."

Criticism of gendered provisions
Professor Carol Louw of the University of South Africa claims that female-specific provisions in right to sit laws "reinforced stereotypes regarding women's frailty." Law professors Sacha Prechal and Noreen Burrows argued against sex-specific provisions in right to sit laws because "working conditions should be as safe and as pleasant as possible for all employees" regardless of sex.

Opposition to right to sit laws
The American Tort Reform Association's "Judicial Hellholes" program has denounced California's suitable seating law for allegedly protecting "lazy cashiers and their opportunistic lawyers".

See also
Right to sit

References

External links
“I Thought It Was A Joke”: Store Manager Writes Up An Employee, Says When You’re Sitting On A Chair, It’s Not To Lounge Around, Bored Panda
‘Some managers just want to see workers struggle’: Former Aldi cashier says he was written-up for sitting in his chair ‘too comfortably’, The Daily Dot

History of retail in the United States
Labor movement in the United States
Labor history of the United States
Labor rights
Manufacturing in the United States
Occupational safety and health
Progressive Era in the United States
Right to sit
Women's rights in the United States
Working-class feminism